The Siam Cement Public Company Limited (SCG) is the largest and oldest cement and building material company in Thailand and Southeast Asia. In 2016, SCG was also ranked as the second largest company in Thailand and the 604th largest public company in the world by Forbes. The company is SET50 and SETHD-listed and an industry benchmark. The company's major shareholder is King Vajiralongkorn, which owns 30 percent of Siam Cement's shares.

Consolidated revenues were 450 billion baht (US$14 billion) in FY2017. The cement and building materials unit contributed 38 percent; 44 percent from the chemicals unit; and 18 percent from the packaging unit. In 2016, SCG was ranked No.1 of the top graduate employer in Thailand polled by Asia Internship Program.

SCG was founded to set up the first cement plant in Bangkok, Thailand by a royal decree of King Rama VI (Vajiravudh) in 1913. Since then, the company has expanded into various businesses with three core business units: SCG Cement-building materials; SCG Chemicals; and SCG Packaging. Now, SCG heavily invests their company into Southeast Asia regions including packaging businesses in Malaysia, a petrochemical complex in Vietnam, and many cement plants around the regions.

SCG employs approximately 54,000 employees. The products are marketed domestically and exported to all regions of the world. Cementhai Holding Co., Ltd. oversees SCG's investment in various businesses. Most are joint ventures with internationally renowned companies, for example, Kubota, Yamato Kogyo, Aisin Takaoka Group, Nippon Steel, Toyota Motor, Michelin, Hayes Lemmerz, Siam Mitsui, and Dow Chemical company.

Research and development
SCG emphasizes research and development. In 2016, R&D spending was one percent of sales and value-added products contributed more than 35 percent of sales. In 2017, HVA products accounted for nearly 40 percent of sales.

Siam Research and Innovation Company Limited conducts research and development of new products and services related to cement, mortar, concrete, building materials, 3D printing, prefabrication, recycled aggregate, and refractory.

In 2014, SCG Chemicals acquired 51 percent of Norner for developing plastic and polymer technology. In 2017, SCG received the "Asia IP Elite 2016" award for the third consecutive year. The award is given by Intellectual Asset Management (IAM), a leading magazine in strategic management of intellectual property.

Sponsorship
The Siam Cement Group is sponsor of football, badminton, and golf events in Thailand and Southeast Asia.

References

External links
 The Siam Cement Group
 Forbes Global 2000 (2007)

Manufacturing companies based in Bangkok
Cement companies of Thailand
Companies based in Bonifacio Global City
Manufacturing companies established in 1913
Companies listed on the Stock Exchange of Thailand
1913 establishments in Siam
Thai brands
Thai Royal Warrant holders
Vajiralongkorn